Russ Parr (born 1959 in California) is an American radio DJ, film director, writer, actor and television personality known for such television shows as Rock 'N' America.

Career
Parr began as a Production Services Director at ABC TV.
Russ was the morning DJ on KDAY doing imitations of Magic Johnson, Ronald Reagan and other celebrities. He also worked as a stand-up comic for eight years, performing his first show as an opening act for Joan Rivers in Santa Monica, California. Parr also found parts on a number of television shows including Martin, The Jenny Jones Show, and Turnstyle, and appeared in television commercials for Kodak and McDonald's. Parr left KDAY (Hollywood) in 1989 and ended up working on KJMZ in Dallas, Texas.

Before Parr began as a radio personality, however, he had a recording career under the pseudonym Bobby Jimmy. In the mid-1980s, he owned and ran his own recording label, Rapsur Records (an inversion of his name). On it he released records as Bobby Jimmy and the Critters. He scored a few hits, including "Roaches" (a parody of Timex Social Club's song "Rumors"); "We Like Ugly Women," "One Glove" (a song satirizing Michael Jackson), and "Ugly Knuckle Butt," which still receives airplay on such outlets as the Doctor Demento Show. Bobby Jimmy released three albums before fading into obscurity.  Bobby Jimmy and The Critters was also credited on N.W.A's first album N.W.A and the Posse (1987), because Arabian Prince was a member of The Critters. 

In 1989, he left Hollywood (where he was a morning host on Los Angeles' 1580 KDAY, the first all hip-hop radio station) for Dallas, Texas, where he worked at KJMZ 100.3 JAMZ. He also launched FLAVA TV, which enabled him to direct, write, and act.

In 1996 he moved to Washington, D.C. and Radio One's 93.9 WKYS-FM, where he began the Russ Parr Morning Show with Olivia Foxx. By Spring 1997 the show was number one in the D.C. radio market. In December 2002 Foxx left and the show went national. Georgia Foy, also known as Alfredas, Parr's former co-host in Texas, joined as Foxx's replacement.

Parr made his directing debut with the 2006 drama The Last Stand. He directed the roast of John Witherspoon, as well as the comedies Love for Sale, Something Like a Business, 35 and Ticking, and The Undershepherd.

Currently, Parr is the host of the Russ Parr Morning Show, heard weekdays by more than 3.2 million listeners in 45 U.S. cities, and nationally syndicated by Reach Media. He also hosts a weekend show, On Air with Russ Parr, which can be heard on more than 40  radio stations. Aside from his radio gigs, Parr is also the co-host of the TV One dating show Get the Hook Up.

References

External links
Official Russ Parr Morning Show Website
Russ Parr Morning Show on American Urban Radio Networks
On the Air with Russ Parr on American Urban Radio Networks
The Last Stand – The Drama of Comedy A Russ Parr Film (Warner Home Video)
Russ Parr discusses The Last Stand on Reelblack TV

American people of Nigerien descent
American radio personalities
American television personalities
Urban One
TV One (American TV channel)
Radio personalities from Washington, D.C.
African-American film directors
American male television actors
American male film actors
Living people
1959 births
Film directors from Washington, D.C.